"Corpus Earthling" is an episode of the original The Outer Limits television show. It first aired on 18 November 1963, during the first season.

Opening narration

Plot
Intelligent, parasitic extraterrestrials that resemble Terran rocks, intent on enslaving the human race, find a hideout in geologist Dr. Jonas Temple's lab. Although undetected by ordinary humans, physician Dr. Paul Cameron, who has a surgically implanted metal plate in his skull, is able to "hear" the alien "rocks" communicate with each other. Aware that he can hear them (while referring to Paul as "the listener"), they realize he is a threat, and compel him to kill himself by jumping from the lab window. At the last moment he is saved when his wife, Laurie, Dr. Temple's assistant, returns to the lab, breaking the aliens' mind control.

Thinking he is going insane, Paul takes an impulsive vacation to Mexico with Laurie to help clear his troubled mind. Dr. Temple, now controlled by one of the "rocks" after it enters his body, pursues them.

In Mexico, Laurie becomes possessed after Dr. Temple finds her alone in the remote desert cabin that she and Paul had rented, and is commanded by the aliens to possess her husband upon his return. Fighting for his life, Paul is forced to stab Temple, and shoot Laurie (though it is not clear that she dies), forcing the aliens to evacuate the bodies they inhabited, thus showing their true form –hideous, shiny-black, crab-like beings with two glowing eyes. He then starts a fire inside the cabin, where the aliens are presumably destroyed, while carrying Laurie's seemingly lifeless body away from the blaze.

Closing narration

Background
Adapted from Louis Charbonneau's novel Corpus Earthling, first published by Zenith Books in 1960. In the novel, Paul is an unmarried university instructor with amorous desires for Laurie, one of his students. He is a latent telepath who has been compelled, on at least three occasions, toward suicide by an alien force that calls him "the listener". The invaders were brought to Earth with the first geological samples from Mars (the story is set post 1990). Dr Temple, who diagnoses Paul as schizophrenic after he reveals he hears voices, is the first to be possessed when he touches the alien rocks with his tongue. At the end, after killing the aliens, Paul finds a telepathic girlfriend.

This was the second of three episodes to star Robert Culp (the other two were "The Architects of Fear" written by Meyer Dolinski and "Demon with a Glass Hand" by Harlan Ellison). Culp indicated that of the three episodes, he felt the "talking rocks" episode was the one he liked least of "The Outer Limits" episodes he shot.

Original air date
The original air date for the episode was four days prior to the assassination of President John F. Kennedy. The following episode, "Nightmare", would be delayed an extra week and would air on December 2, 1963.

Cast
 Robert Culpas Dr. Paul Cameron
 Salome Jensas Laurie Cameron
 Barry Atwateras Dr. Jonas Temple
 David Garneras Ralph
 Ken Renardas Caretaker
 Robert Johnsonas voice of Alien Rocks (uncredited)

References

External links
 "Corpus Earthling" appreciation by Mark Holcomb

The Outer Limits (1963 TV series season 1) episodes
1963 American television episodes
Television episodes directed by Gerd Oswald